The International Association of Wagner Societies (Der Richard-Wagner-Verband International e.V., also known as "Der RWVI") is an affiliation of Wagner societies (Richard Wagner-Verband) that promotes interest and research into the works of Richard Wagner, raises funds for scholarships for young music students, singers, and instrumentalists, and supports the annual Bayreuth Festival. It also sponsors symposia, holds singing competitions for Wagnerian voices, and issues awards for stage direction and stagings of Wagner's operas. The association is a nonprofit organization.

History 
The first Richard Wagner society was launched in Mannheim, Germany in 1871, one year after the premiere of the German composer's opera Die Walküre ("The Valkyrie") in Munich.  The brainchild of Wagner's longtime friend, the music publisher Emil Heckel, the first society was a simple, locally conceived venue for celebrating Wagner's music.  In the wake of Wagner's difficulties in securing interest in the public subscription for his future Bayreuth Festival, Heckel suggested to the composer that he sponsor additional societies to help secure support.  Wagner embraced the idea enthusiastically, and by 1872, societies had been established in Vienna, Berlin, Leipzig and London (the latter founded by Edward Dannreuther (1844–1905), the author of Richard Wagner: His Tendencies and Theories published in 1873).

Wagner's dream, as described in a letter written in 1882, was that his Bayreuth Festival would be free for everyone to attend, however this was never possible because of the extremely high costs to organize and produce it. Nonetheless, based on Wagner's desires, societies refocused their efforts and began making it possible for promising talented musicians to attend. Public interest in supporting subscriptions to fund scholarships was initially tepid, but from 1919 forward, the number of societies increased steadily.

The International Association of Wagner Societies was founded in 1991 in Lyon. Today, more than 26,000 members in 147 societies belong to the International Association of Wagner Societies around the globe. The number of groups under the organization's auspices has expanded considerably in the last fifty years.  Wagner societies can be found in all parts of the world, including Venice, Great Britain, Shanghai, Tokyo, Lisbon, Melbourne, Adelaide, Ankara, New York City, Toronto, Cape Town, Bangkok, New Zealand, Puerto Rico and the Ottawa/Gatineau area.

The societies are very diverse and offer a wide range of Wagner-related activities, including concerts, lectures, and publishing. The main organization holds a symposium called "Wagner Days in Venice" (Giornate Wagneriane a Venezia) in Italy each autumn.

Chairs and presidents 
 Horst Eggers
 Nicolaus Richter
 Prof. Alessandra Althoff-Pugliese
 Prof. Dr. Hans-Michael Schneider
 Jacques Bouffier
 Prof. Dr. Günter Cisek
 Georg Riesner
 Andrea Buchanan
 Rainer Fineske
 Selma Gudmundsdottir
 Gisbert Lehmhaus
 Karl Russwurm
 Dipl.-Ing. Heinz Weyringer
 Christian Ducor
 Dr. Matthias Lachenmann

Richard Wagner International Congress 

Every year members of the local Wagner Societies gather for the Richard Wagner International Congress, to share experiences and to plan for the future in sessions. The congress takes place in a different city each year:
2019: Venice
2018: Innsbruck
2017: Budapest
2016: Strasbourg
2015: Dessau
2014: Graz
2013: Leipzig
2012: Prague
2011: Wrocław
2010: Stralsund
2009: Dresden
2008: Geneva
2007: Weimar
2006: Tallinn and Helsinki
2005: Leipzig
2004: Augsburg
2003: Copenhagen
2002: Seville
2001: Freiburg im Breisgau
2000: Berlin
1990: Hannover
1986: Vienna

Congresses have also taken place in Frankfurt am Main, Bordeaux, Trier, and Budapest.

See also
Bayreuth Festival
Irene Sloan, Wagner Society of Southern California founder
Richard Wagner
Ca' Vendramin Calergi (Venice association and Wagner Museum)
Richard Wagner Canada

Official website
 The Wagner Verband website – contains links or contact information for all individual societies.

Wagner studies
Richard Wagner
International music organizations
Organisations based in Bavaria
Musical groups established in 1991
1991 establishments in Germany